The Mother Language Lovers Of The World is a non-profit organisation that works for the protection of languages. It was vital in getting 21 February declared the International Mother Language Day by UNESCO. 21 February is known as the Language Movement Day, which is a national holiday of Bangladesh taking place on 21 February each year and commemorating the Bengali language movement.

History
The Mother Language Lovers Of The World was established by Rafiqul Islam in 1998 with ten members in Vancouver, Canada. In 1999, The Mother Language Lovers Of The World successfully got UNESCO to declare 21 February the International Mother Language Day.

The Mother Language Lovers Of The World was awarded the Ekushey Padak in 2011.

References

1998 establishments in Canada
Recipients of the Ekushey Padak
Organizations based in Vancouver